Brandon Joseph Saldaña (born May 20, 1991 in New York) is the American-born goalkeeper who plays for the Puerto Rican National Football Team also known as “El Huracán Azul” (The Blue Hurricane). Saldaña has earned three international caps with the Puerto Rican squad. In addition, Saldaña has served as the backup goalkeeper on the Amherst College (Division III) Men’s Varsity Soccer Team in Amherst (Massachusetts).

Background 

Saldaña’s grandparents were born in Puerto Rico and emigrated to New York City. Saldaña is a second generation American and grew up in Garden City, New York with his parents (Joseph Saldaña & Evette Burset) and older sibling (X’Ania Marie Saldaña).

Early years

Massapequa Terminators 
Before beginning his high school career at Chaminade High School (Mineola, NY) Saldaña served as a goalkeeper (May 2004 - August 2010) for the Massapequa Terminators, an elite travel Soccer team. Saldaña traveled both nationally and internationally to compete in Premier Soccer Tournaments.

Chaminade High School 
Saldaña attended Chaminade High School (Mineola, NY) from August 2005 to June 2009, where he graduated academically ranked in the 90th percentile and served as a goalkeeper on the school's varsity soccer team.

Amherst College 

Saldaña attends Amherst College (Amherst, Massachusetts) where he is studying for his Bachelor of Arts with a concentration in Mathematics. His anticipated graduation was May 2013 and his long-term goal is a career in financial services. Saldaña serves as the backup goalkeeper on the Amherst College Men’s Varsity Team. Saldaña has appeared in four games this season, allowing one goal and saving two shots in just over 132 minutes of play. In addition to his academic and athletic endeavors, Saldaña is a co-owner and operator of MAStorage, Inc., a storage company providing storage for students at Amherst, UMASS, Mt. Holyoke, Smith and Hampshire Colleges.

“El Huracán Azul” 

Saldaña began his international career with “El Huracán Azul” (World Rank 106) in early October 2011 after the starting goalkeeper was injured on Sept. 2 while playing in the World Cup qualifier against St. Kitts and Nevis. Saldaña was flown down to tryout and quickly earned his spot in the starting line up. Saldaña earned his first international shutout on October 11, 2011 against team Canada (0-0) at BMO Field in Toronto, Canada.

International games played 
 October 7, 2011: Puerto Rico v. St. Kitts & Nevis: 1-1
 October 11, 2011: Puerto Rico v. Canada: 0-0
 November 14, 2011: Puerto Rico v. St. Lucia 3-0

References

American sportspeople of Puerto Rican descent
Puerto Rican footballers
Puerto Rican expatriate footballers
Association football goalkeepers
Living people
1991 births
Puerto Rico international footballers
Amherst Mammoths athletes